Lailatou Amadou Lele (born May 29, 1983) is a Nigerien taekwondo practitioner, who competed for the women's featherweight category (57 kg) at the 2008 Summer Olympics in Beijing. She was disqualified from the competition for unknown reasons, allowing her first opponent Debora Nunes of Brazil to be given an automatic free pass for the subsequent round.

References

External links

NBC 2008 Olympics profile

1983 births
Living people
Olympic taekwondo practitioners of Niger
Taekwondo practitioners at the 2008 Summer Olympics
Nigerien female taekwondo practitioners
21st-century Nigerien people